Degree of saturation may refer to:
Degree of saturation (earth sciences), a ratio of liquid to the total volume of voids in a porous material
Degree of saturation (traffic), a measure used in traffic engineering

See also
Degree of unsaturation, formula is used in organic chemistry